Fallin is Tay Kewei's second label album, released on February 14, 2012.

Track listing

External links 
 https://web.archive.org/web/20120611043939/http://www.taykewei.com/info/#/about-kewei/discography-2/

2012 albums
Tay Kewei albums